Amarnath Basdeo (born 13 April 1977) is a Trinidadian cricketer. He played in two first-class matches for Trinidad and Tobago in 1996/97 and 1997/98.

See also
 List of Trinidadian representative cricketers

References

External links
 

1977 births
Living people
Trinidad and Tobago cricketers